Víctor Manuel Basadre Orozco (born 16 February 1970) is a Spanish football manager who manages Lithuanian club FK Sūduva.

Career
Basadre was born in Lugo, Galicia, and after a footballing career at SG Comercial-Estudiantes he began his managerial career with clubs in his native region. In 1997, he joined Real Murcia as Vicente Campillo's assistant, and was appointed as the reserves' manager in the following year.

Basadre subsequently returned to his native Galicia, managing CD As Pontes and CD Lugo and being sacked from the latter on 19 September 2001. After spells at SD Noja and Caravaca CF, he joined Lorca Deportiva CF, being named manager of the latter on 7 March 2007.

On 17 July 2009, after a spell at Murcia Deportivo CF, Basadre was named in Unai Emery's staff at Valencia CF. On 8 July 2011, after a season at FC Puente Tocinos, he was appointed at the helm of Murcia's Juvenil C squad.

References

External links
 

1970 births
Living people
Spanish footballers
Footballers from Lugo
Spanish football managers
Segunda División managers
Segunda División B managers
Tercera División managers
CD Lugo managers
Caravaca CF managers
UCAM Murcia CF managers
Lorca Deportiva CF managers
Real Murcia managers
Association footballers not categorized by position
Volos FC managers
FK Sūduva Marijampolė managers
Spanish expatriate football managers
Spanish expatriate sportspeople in Greece
Spanish expatriate sportspeople in Lithuania
Expatriate football managers in Greece
Expatriate football managers in Lithuania